Clara Driscoll  may refer to:
Clara Driscoll (philanthropist) (1881–1945), Texas-born businesswoman, philanthropist, and historic preservationist
Clara Driscoll (glass designer) (1861–1944), director of the Tiffany Studios' Women's Glass Cutting Department, New York City